The Prince of Wales' Own Civil Service Rifles was an infantry regiment of the Volunteer Force and Territorial Force of the British Army from 1798 to 1921; it saw active service in the Boer War and World War I as part of the London Regiment.

History

Early history
The regiment was originally formed as the Bank of England Volunteers in 1798 but was disbanded in 1814 at the end of the Napoleonic Wars. The regiment was re-raised by Viscount Bury on the formation of the Volunteer Force as the 21st Middlesex Middlesex Rifle Volunteers (Civil Service Rifles) in 1860. By 1880 and the re-numbering of London Rifle Volunteers the unit was titled 12th Middlesex (Civil Service) Rifle Volunteer Corps and were linked as a Volunteer Battalion of the King's Royal Rifle Corps.

On formation of the Territorial Force in 1908 the Civil Service Rifles became part of the newly formed London Regiment and was titled 15th Battalion London Regiment (Civil Service Rifles).

First World War

At the start of the First World War the battalion established its headquarters at Somerset House; the commanding officer, Lt Col RG Hays, refused to serve overseas, an example followed by most of the men of his battalion. During the war the regiment eventually expanded to two battalions, with the 1st Battalion arriving in France in March 1915 forming part of the 4th London Brigade, part of the 2nd London Division.

Inter-war
Following the war the Civil Service Rifles were amalgamated with the 16th (County of London) Battalion, London Regiment in 1921.

Battle honours
The regiment's battle honours were as follows:
 South Africa 1900-02
 The Great War (3 battalions):
 Festubert 1915, Loos, Somme 1916 '18, Flers-Courcelette, Le Transloy, Messines 1917, Ypres 1917, Cambrai 1917, St. Quentin, Ancre 1918, Albert 1918, Bapaume 1918, Pursuit to Mons, France and Flanders 1915-18, Doiran 1917, Macedonia 1916-17, Gaza, Nebi Samwil, Jerusalem, Palestine 1917-18

Regimental motto
Ich Dien – (German for "I serve", a contraction of ich diene), the motto of the Prince of Wales.

Uniform
From 1863 until 1888 the regiment wore a dark grey uniforms with royal blue facings and a shako. In that year the home service helmet of the regular infantry was adopted as headdress. At a time when colourful uniforms were still the norm the sombre colour of this uniform was considered unattractive and blamed for a fall off in recruiting. Accordingly light grey was adopted in 1890, although royal blue was still retained for the facings in full dress uniform until 1914. Khaki drill was worn in South Africa and the standard khaki of the British Army in France during World War I.

Regimental memorial

The memorial for the Prince of Wales' Own Civil Service Rifles is situated at Somerset House, London.  It was designed in 1923 by Sir Edwin Lutyens OM, KCIE, PRA.

References

Bibliography
 Beckett, Ian F.W. (1982) Riflemen Form: A study of the Rifle Volunteer Movement 1859–1908, Aldershot: Ogilby Trusts, .
 The History of the Prince of Wales' Own Civil Service Rifles. London : Wyman & Sons Ltd., 1921.
 Knight, Jill. (2004) The Civil Service Rifles in the Great War: all bloody gentlemen. Barnsley : Pen & Sword Military,  
 Merrick, Edward, Lt, (1891) A history of the Civil Service Rifle Volunteers (including the volunteers of the Bank of England), Sheppard and St John, London
 2/15th Battalion. County of London Regiment Prince of Wales Own Civil Service Rifles. London: printed by The Art Reproduction Co., 1920

External links
 Civil Service Rifles at Regiments.org

Battalions of the London Regiment (1908–1938)
Military units and formations in London
Military units and formations in the City of Westminster